Guillaume Victor Émile Augier (17 September 182025 October 1889) was a French dramatist. He was the thirteenth member to occupy seat 1 of the Académie française on 31 March 1857.

Biography
Augier was born at Valence, Drôme, the grandson of Pigault Lebrun, and belonged to the well-to-do bourgeoisie in spirit as well as by birth.  After a good education and legal training, he wrote a play in two acts and in verse, La Ciguë (1844), which was refused at the Théâtre Français, but produced with as considerable success at the Odéon. This settled his career. 
From then on, at fairly regular intervals, either alone or in collaboration with other writers—Jules Sandeau, Eugène Marin Labiche, Édouard Foussier—he produced plays such as Le Fils de Giboyer (1862) - which was regarded as an attack on the clerical party in France, and was surely brought out by the direct intervention of the emperor. 
His last comedy, Les Fourchambault, belongs to the year 1879. After that date he wrote no more, restrained by the fear of producing inferior work.

He died at his home at Croissy-sur-Seine.

Career
Augier described his own life as "without incident". L'Aventurière (1848), the first of his important works, already shows a deviation from romantic ideals; and in the Mariage d'Olympe (1855), the courtesan is shown as she is, not glorified as in Dumas's Dame aux Camélias. 
In Gabrielle (1849), the husband, not the lover, is the sympathetic character. 
Augier provided the libretto for the first opera composed by Charles Gounod, Sapho (1851). In this version of the story a courtesan Glycère is the perfidious villainess, and the self-sacrificing title character is wholly heterosexual, not a "sapphist". In the Lionnes pauvres (1858) the wife who sells her favours comes under the lash.  
Greed of gold, social moralization, ultramontanism, lust of power, these are satirized Les Effrontés (1861), Le Fils de Giboyer (1862), La Contagion announced under the title of Le Baron d'Estrigaud (1866), Lions et renards (1869) - which, with Le Gendre de Monsieur Poirier (1854), written in collaboration with Jules Sandeau, reach the high-water mark of Augier's art; in Philiberte (1853), he produced a graceful and delicate drawing-room comedy; and in Jean de Thommeray, acted in 1873 after the great reverses of 1870, the regenerating note of patriotism rings high and clear.

His last two dramas, Madame Caverlet (1876) and Les Fourchambault (1879), are problem plays. But it would be unfair to suggest that Augier was a mere preacher. He was a moralist in the same sense in which the term can be applied to Molière and the great dramatists. Nor does the interest of dramas depend on elaborate plot. It springs from character. His men and women are real, several of them typical. Augier's first drama, La Ciguë, belongs to a time (1844) when romantic drama was on the wane; and his almost elusively domestic range of subject scarcely lends itself to lyric bursts of pure poetry. His verse, if not that of a great poet, has excellent dramatic qualities, while the prose of his prose dramas is admirable for directness, alertness, sinew and a large and effective wit.

See also
 Nostalgie de la boue, a phrase drawn from the 1855 play Mariage d'Olympe

References

Attribution:

External links

 
 

1820 births
1889 deaths
People from Valence, Drôme
Members of the Académie Française
Grand Officiers of the Légion d'honneur
19th-century French dramatists and playwrights
19th-century French male writers